Akunnaaq (old spelling: Akúnâk) is a settlement in the Qeqertalik municipality in western Greenland. Its population was 66 in 2020. The settlement was founded in 1850.

Transport 
Air Greenland serves the village as part of government contract, with winter-only helicopter flights between Akunnaaq Heliport and Aasiaat Airport. Settlement flights in the Disko Bay are unique in that they are operated only during winter and spring.

During summer and autumn, when the waters of Disko Bay are navigable, communication between settlements is by sea only, serviced by Diskoline. The ferry links Akunnaaq with Aasiaat, Ikamiut, and Qasigiannguit.

Population 
The population of Akunnaaq has decreased by nearly 40 percent since the 1990 levels, levelling off in the 2000s.

References 

Disko Bay
Populated places in Greenland
Populated places of Arctic Greenland
Populated places established in 1850